Väinö Rainio (30 April 1896 – 28 July 1979) was a Finnish athlete. He competed at the 1924 Summer Olympics and the 1928 Summer Olympics.

References

External links
 

1896 births
1979 deaths
Athletes (track and field) at the 1924 Summer Olympics
Athletes (track and field) at the 1928 Summer Olympics
Finnish male long jumpers
Finnish male triple jumpers
Olympic athletes of Finland
Place of birth missing